Wörwag Pharma is an independent family-owned pharmaceutical company headquartered in Böblingen, Germany. It was founded in 1971 by pharmacist Fritz Wörwag. It sells prescription and over-the-counter preparations and food supplements.

Wörwag Pharma specializes in biofactors, which include vitamins, minerals, and trace elements.

History 
The city pharmacy was founded in 1965 in Stuttgart-Zuffenhausen. In the early 1970s, the owner Fritz Wörwag started producing and selling his own pharmaceutical products, which was the basis for the founding of Wörwag Pharma in 1971. The best-known preparations from the initial years included Magnerot Classic (magnesium orotate) and Milgamma (benfotiamine). To accelerate the development of the business, the company was converted into a corporation in 1977.

Wörwag Pharma became a specialist for vitamins and trace elements and a manufacturer of generic drugs. In 1993, a branch opened in Hungary – the first international site outside of Germany – and later, other branches in Eastern Europe, Russia, and Central Asia were added. Since then, Wörwag Pharma has also been present in Asian and South American countries, for example, in Vietnam and Peru.

In 1996, Wörwag Pharma relocated its head office from Stuttgart to Böblingen. In 2001, the two children, Marcus Wörwag and Monika Wörwag, took over management of the company from their father. They continued the expansion course of Wörwag Pharma and concentrated primarily on biofactors. They spun off the generics business in 2015 into the independent subsidiary AAA-Pharma. In January 2019, Marcus Wörwag moved from the management to the advisory board, where he continues to shape the strategic direction of the group.

Products 
Wörwag Pharma offers medicinal products for the prevention and treatment of the concomitant diseases and complications of diabetes, for neuralgia and pain, and to maintain mental fitness. Overall, the company's product range includes 26 biofactor brands in Germany alone. Magnerot and Milgamma are still two significant brands in Wörwag Pharma's product range.

Structure 
Wörwag Pharma GmbH & Co. KG is a limited partnership (Kommanditgesellschaft) according to German law. Its general partner is Dr. Fritz Wörwag GmbH, a limited liability company (Gesellschaft mit beschränkter Haftung), wholly owned by the company founder. Besides, he and other family members are directly or indirectly involved as limited partners. The vast majority of liability contributions by the limited partners is apportioned to the family-owned Wörwag GmbH and Wörwag Pharma Beteiligung GmbH.

The annual financial statements of Wörwag Pharma GmbH & Co. KG is included in the consolidated financial statements of Wörwag Pharma Beteiligung GmbH. The latter acts as the holding company for the domestic and foreign subsidiaries. Wörwag Pharma International GmbH controls the international subsidiaries.

The management of Wörwag Pharma consists of Monika Wörwag as well as Gerhard Mayer and Jochen Schlindwein, both commercial directors. All are authorized signatories of Wörwag Pharma GmbH & Co. KG and at the same time are also directors of Dr. Fritz Wörwag GmbH.

Locations 
In addition to the head office in Böblingen, there are currently 19 country offices in Almaty, Baku, Belgrade, Bratislava, Budapest, Chișinău, Cluj-Napoca, Ho Chi Minh City, Hong Kong, Kyiv, Lima, Ljubljana, Minsk, Moscow, Beijing, Riga, Sofia, Tashkent, Tbilisi, and Warsaw. These offices manage the business in about 30 countries.

References

External links 

 Official website of Wörwag Pharma

German brands
Companies based in Baden-Württemberg
1971 establishments in Germany
Pharmaceutical companies of Germany
Pharmacy brands
Böblingen